Champagne Binet is an independent Champagne house. 
The house produces Brut, Blanc de Blancs, and Rosé de saignée Champagne. Arnaud Vidal serves as its President. The Champagne is made exclusively from Grand Cru grapes.

References

External links

See also

 History of Champagne
 Champagne production
 Grower Champagne

Champagne (province)
French brands